Echinoleucopis is a genus of flies belonging to the family Chamaemyiidae.

Species:

Echinoleucopis bennetti 
Echinoleucopis ceroplastophaga 
Echinoleucopis grioti 
Echinoleucopis iota 
Echinoleucopis lota 
Echinoleucopis macula 
Echinoleucopis nigrolinea

References

Chamaemyiidae